The data for international body mass indexes was published by the World Health Organization. The list below refers to year 2014.

Data

* indicates "Health in COUNTRY or TERRITORY" links.

See also
List of countries by obesity rate

References

Body mass index
Obesity
Body Mass Index
Body Mass Index